The Best of Dr. Hook, later re-titled Revisited, is the first compilation album by American country rock band Dr. Hook & the Medicine Show, released in 1976. The songs are taken from Dr. Hook's first three studio albums.

Track listing 
All tracks composed by Shel Silverstein

Personnel 
 Ray Sawyer – lead vocals
 Dennis Locorriere – lead guitar, lead vocals
 George Cummings – steel, electric and Hawaiian guitars, backing vocals
 Rik Elswit – rhythm guitar
 Billy Francis – keyboards, backing vocals
 Jance Garfat – bass
 Jay David – drums, backing vocals

Charts

References 

Dr. Hook & the Medicine Show compilation albums
1976 compilation albums
Columbia Records compilation albums
CBS Records compilation albums
Albums produced by Ron Haffkine